CPIA may refer to:

 Chemical Propulsion Information Analysis Center
 Country Policy and Institutional Assessment, which is the rating of countries against a set of 16 criteria grouped in four clusters: economic management, structural policies, policies for social inclusion and equity, and public sector management and institutions.
 Criminal Procedure and Investigations Act 1996, a UK Act of Parliament.